Robert Lee Moore was an Irish international footballer who played club football for Ulster as a half back.

Moore made two appearances for Ireland at the 1887 British Home Championship.

External links
NIFG profile

Year of birth missing
Year of death missing
Irish association footballers (before 1923)
Pre-1950 IFA international footballers
Ulster F.C. players
Association football wing halves